The 1933 Hamilton municipal election was held on December 4, 1933 to select one Mayor, four Controllers, and sixteen members of the Hamilton, Ontario City Council, two from each of the city's eight wards. Voters also cast ballots for trustees for the public school board.

Campaign

The civic election of 1933 saw a decline in support for sitting mayor John Peebles, who faced increasing attacks from both the right and left. In the months leading up to the vote, local communists sought municipal support for their campaign against discrimination. Peebles vocally opposed the campaign and objected to the 'tone' of the groups' communication. Having been heckled by protesters angry about hunger in the city during his nomination meeting, Peebles' popularity began to slip with the electorate. Despite this, the mayor received support from the Hamilton Spectator, highlighting his record on the economy and poverty in the city.

Stemming from their success in the previous election, the Policy for 1933 group changed their name to the Economy Slate, running fifteen candidates, twelve of whom were sitting controllers and aldermen. Advocating a smaller city budget and a low tax rate, the Economy Slate continued to press for classical liberal economic policies that were in line with the early policies of the Bennet government in Ottawa. Right-leaning alderman Nora-Frances Henderson, though not asked to join the Economy Slate, campaigned as an independent member of the slate, advertising that she would uphold their principles on council.

The local branch of the Independent Labour Party opted to join forces with the newly founded Cooperative Commonwealth Federation and run candidates on a unified ticket. Distancing themselves from radical unionists and right-leaning aldermen, the slate ran advertisements that attacked both candidates from the Communist Party and the newly constituted Economy Slate.

On election night, Wilton won the election with the help of area Conservatives with whom he was affiliated. Despite losing Andy Gaul of Ward One, the Economy Slate grew from ten members to twelve, with Nora-Frances Henderson and Andy Frame supporting the slate in principle, despite not receiving support from the group. The extension of endorsement to the Liberal-affiliated William Ainsley and Conservative Thomas Lewington gave the group a commanding majority on council.

Despite the unified CCF-ILP slate that contested the election, the group failed to secure more seats than the year prior. The party maintained its support in the city's working class wards and proved to be competitive in the west-end Ward Three where popular local unionist Charles Pollicott of the Strathcona neighbourhood was the party's candidate, but only elected six members to council, giving them a comparatively small opposition in relation to the strength of the Economy Slate.

Mayor

|-
!rowspan="2" colspan="2"|Candidate
!rowspan="2" colspan="1"|Affiliation
!colspan="3"|Popular vote
|-
! Votes
! %
! ±%
|-
| style="background-color:#1560BD;" |
| style="text-align:left;" | Herbert Wilton
| style="text-align:left;" | Independent
| style="text-align:right;" |24,140
| style="text-align:right;" |57.41%
| style="text-align:right;" |n/a
|-
| style="background-color:#FA8072;" |
| style="text-align:left;" | John Peebles (incumbent)
| style="text-align:left;" | Independent
| style="text-align:right;" |17,906
| style="text-align:right;" |42.59
| style="text-align:right;" |-14.73%
|-
| style="text-align:right;background-color:#FFFFFF;" colspan="3" |Total votes
| style="text-align:right;background-color:#FFFFFF;" |42,046
| style="text-align:right;background-color:#FFFFFF;" |100%
| style="text-align:right;background-color:#FFFFFF;" |
|-
| style="text-align:right;background-color:#FFFFFF;" colspan="3" |Registered voters
| style="text-align:right;background-color:#FFFFFF;" |n/a
| style="text-align:right;background-color:#FFFFFF;" |n/a
| style="text-align:right;background-color:#FFFFFF;" |n/a
|-
| style="text-align:left;" colspan="6" |Note: Candidate campaign colours are used as a visual differentiation between candidates and to indicate affiliation.
|-
| style="text-align:left;" colspan="13" |Sources: "How City Voted To Choose Mayor", Hamilton Spectator, Tuesday, December 5, 1933, pp. 17.
|}

Board of Control

|-
!rowspan="2" colspan="2"|Candidate
!rowspan="2" colspan="1"|Affiliation
!colspan="3"|Popular vote
|-
! Votes
! %
! ±%
|-
| style="background-color:#FADA5E;" |
| style="text-align:left;" | Sam Lawrence (incumbent)
| style="text-align:left;" | CCF
| style="text-align:right;" |22,310
| style="text-align:right;" |n/a
| style="text-align:right;" |n/a
|-
| style="background-color:#B0E0E6;" |
| style="text-align:left;" | Freeman Treleaven (incumbent)
| style="text-align:left;" | Economy Slate
| style="text-align:right;" |20,914
| style="text-align:right;" |n/a
| style="text-align:right;" |n/a
|-
| style="background-color:#B0E0E6;" |
| style="text-align:left;" | Donald MacFarlane (incumbent)
| style="text-align:left;" | Economy Slate
| style="text-align:right;" |19,114
| style="text-align:right;" |n/a
| style="text-align:right;" |n/a
|-
| style="background-color:#B0E0E6;" |
| style="text-align:left;" | Septimus DuMoulin (incumbent)
| style="text-align:left;" | Economy Slate
| style="text-align:right;" |17,653
| style="text-align:right;" |n/a
| style="text-align:right;" |n/a
|-
| style="background-color:#808080;" |
| style="text-align:left;" | Wallace James
| style="text-align:left;" | Independent
| style="text-align:right;" |15,028
| style="text-align:right;" |n/a
| style="text-align:right;" |n/a
|-
| style="background-color:#FADA5E;" |
| style="text-align:left;" | Charles Smith
| style="text-align:left;" | CCF
| style="text-align:right;" |13,695
| style="text-align:right;" |n/a
| style="text-align:right;" |n/a
|-
| style="background-color:#C41E3A;" |
| style="text-align:left;" | Arthur Avery
| style="text-align:left;" | Communist Party
| style="text-align:right;" |3,848
| style="text-align:right;" |n/a
| style="text-align:right;" |n/a
|-
| style="text-align:right;background-color:#FFFFFF;" colspan="3" |Total votes
| style="text-align:right;background-color:#FFFFFF;" |n/a
| style="text-align:right;background-color:#FFFFFF;" |n/a
| style="text-align:right;background-color:#FFFFFF;" |
|-
| style="text-align:right;background-color:#FFFFFF;" colspan="3" |Registered voters
| style="text-align:right;background-color:#FFFFFF;" |n/a
| style="text-align:right;background-color:#FFFFFF;" |n/a
| style="text-align:right;background-color:#FFFFFF;" |n/a
|-
| style="text-align:left;" colspan="6" |Note: Candidate campaign colours are used as a visual differentiation between candidates and to indicate affiliation.
|-
| style="text-align:left;" colspan="13" |Sources: "Board of Control Summary", Hamilton Spectator, Tuesday, December 5, 1932, pp. 16.
|}

Aldermen

Ward One

|-
!rowspan="2" colspan="2"|Candidate
!rowspan="2" colspan="1"|Affiliation
!colspan="3"|Popular vote
|-
! Votes
! %
! ±%
|-
| style="background-color:#5D8AA8;" |
| style="text-align:left;" | Nora Frances Henderson (incumbent)
| style="text-align:left;" | Independent Economy Slate
| style="text-align:right;" |3,572
| style="text-align:right;" |n/a
| style="text-align:right;" |n/a
|-
| style="background-color:#0047AB;" |
| style="text-align:left;" | William MacFarland
| style="text-align:left;" | Independent
| style="text-align:right;" |3,105
| style="text-align:right;" |n/a
| style="text-align:right;" |n/a
|-
| style="background-color:#B0E0E6;" |
| style="text-align:left;" | Andy Gaul (incumbent)
| style="text-align:left;" | Economy Slate
| style="text-align:right;" |3,019
| style="text-align:right;" |n/a
| style="text-align:right;" |n/a
|-
| style="background-color:#FADA5E;" |
| style="text-align:left;" | Charles Killip
| style="text-align:left;" | CCF
| style="text-align:right;" |1,166
| style="text-align:right;" |n/a
| style="text-align:right;" |n/a
|-
| style="background-color:#91A3B0;" |
| style="text-align:left;" | Joseph Harris
| style="text-align:left;" | Independent
| style="text-align:right;" |504
| style="text-align:right;" |n/a
| style="text-align:right;" |n/a
|-
| style="text-align:right;background-color:#FFFFFF;" colspan="3" |Total votes
| style="text-align:right;background-color:#FFFFFF;" |n/a
| style="text-align:right;background-color:#FFFFFF;" |n/a
| style="text-align:right;background-color:#FFFFFF;" |
|-
| style="text-align:right;background-color:#FFFFFF;" colspan="3" |Registered voters
| style="text-align:right;background-color:#FFFFFF;" |n/a
| style="text-align:right;background-color:#FFFFFF;" |n/a
| style="text-align:right;background-color:#FFFFFF;" |n/a
|-
| style="text-align:left;" colspan="6" |Note: Candidate campaign colours are used as a visual differentiation between candidates and to indicate affiliation.
|-
| style="text-align:left;" colspan="13" |Sources: "How Aldermanic Candidates Ran", Hamilton Spectator, Tuesday, December 5, 1933, pp. 16.
|}

Ward Two

|-
!rowspan="2" colspan="2"|Candidate
!rowspan="2" colspan="1"|Affiliation
!colspan="3"|Popular vote
|-
! Votes
! %
! ±%
|-
| style="background-color:#B0E0E6;" |
| style="text-align:left;" | William Ainsley (incumbent)
| style="text-align:left;" | Economy Slate
| style="text-align:right;" |2,518
| style="text-align:right;" |n/a
| style="text-align:right;" |n/a
|-
| style="background-color:#B0E0E6;" |
| style="text-align:left;" | Thomas Gallagher (incumbent)
| style="text-align:left;" | Economy Slate
| style="text-align:right;" |2,123
| style="text-align:right;" |n/a
| style="text-align:right;" |n/a
|-
| style="background-color:#ACACAC;" |
| style="text-align:left;" | Samuel Cotterell
| style="text-align:left;" | Independent
| style="text-align:right;" |1,489
| style="text-align:right;" |n/a
| style="text-align:right;" |n/a
|-
| style="background-color:#FADA5E;" |
| style="text-align:left;" | John Halcrow
| style="text-align:left;" | CCF
| style="text-align:right;" |1,282
| style="text-align:right;" |n/a
| style="text-align:right;" |n/a
|-
| style="text-align:right;background-color:#FFFFFF;" colspan="3" |Total votes
| style="text-align:right;background-color:#FFFFFF;" |n/a
| style="text-align:right;background-color:#FFFFFF;" |n/a
| style="text-align:right;background-color:#FFFFFF;" |
|-
| style="text-align:right;background-color:#FFFFFF;" colspan="3" |Registered voters
| style="text-align:right;background-color:#FFFFFF;" |n/a
| style="text-align:right;background-color:#FFFFFF;" |n/a
| style="text-align:right;background-color:#FFFFFF;" |n/a
|-
| style="text-align:left;" colspan="6" |Note: Candidate campaign colours are used as a visual differentiation between candidates and to indicate affiliation.
|-
| style="text-align:left;" colspan="13" |Sources: "How Aldermanic Candidates Ran", Hamilton Spectator, Tuesday, December 5, 1933, pp. 16.
|}

Ward Three

|-
!rowspan="2" colspan="2"|Candidate
!rowspan="2" colspan="1"|Affiliation
!colspan="3"|Popular vote
|-
! Votes
! %
! ±%
|-
| style="background-color:#B0E0E6;" |
| style="text-align:left;" | Robert Evans (incumbent)
| style="text-align:left;" | Economy Slate
| style="text-align:right;" |2,446
| style="text-align:right;" |n/a
| style="text-align:right;" |n/a
|-
| style="background-color:#B0E0E6;" |
| style="text-align:left;" | William Fick (incumbent)
| style="text-align:left;" | Economy Slate
| style="text-align:right;" |2,156
| style="text-align:right;" |n/a
| style="text-align:right;" |n/a
|-
| style="background-color:#ACACAC;" |
| style="text-align:left;" | William Hutton
| style="text-align:left;" | Independent
| style="text-align:right;" |1,496
| style="text-align:right;" |n/a
| style="text-align:right;" |n/a
|-
| style="background-color:#3EB489;" |
| style="text-align:left;" | Austin Macaulay
| style="text-align:left;" | Independent
| style="text-align:right;" |1,213
| style="text-align:right;" |n/a
| style="text-align:right;" |n/a
|-
| style="background-color:#FADA5E;" |
| style="text-align:left;" | Henry Ferguson
| style="text-align:left;" | CCF
| style="text-align:right;" |934
| style="text-align:right;" |n/a
| style="text-align:right;" |n/a
|-
| style="background-color:#536878;" |
| style="text-align:left;" | Samuel Bailey
| style="text-align:left;" | Independent
| style="text-align:right;" |398
| style="text-align:right;" |n/a
| style="text-align:right;" |n/a
|-
| style="text-align:right;background-color:#FFFFFF;" colspan="3" |Total votes
| style="text-align:right;background-color:#FFFFFF;" |n/a
| style="text-align:right;background-color:#FFFFFF;" |n/a
| style="text-align:right;background-color:#FFFFFF;" |
|-
| style="text-align:right;background-color:#FFFFFF;" colspan="3" |Registered voters
| style="text-align:right;background-color:#FFFFFF;" |n/a
| style="text-align:right;background-color:#FFFFFF;" |n/a
| style="text-align:right;background-color:#FFFFFF;" |n/a
|-
| style="text-align:left;" colspan="6" |Note: Candidate campaign colours are used as a visual differentiation between candidates and to indicate affiliation.
|-
| style="text-align:left;" colspan="13" |Sources: "How Aldermanic Candidates Ran", Hamilton Spectator, Tuesday, December 5, 1933, pp. 16.
|}

Ward Four

|-
!rowspan="2" colspan="2"|Candidate
!rowspan="2" colspan="1"|Affiliation
!colspan="3"|Popular vote
|-
! Votes
! %
! ±%
|-
| style="background-color:#B0E0E6;" |
| style="text-align:left;" | George Hancock (incumbent)
| style="text-align:left;" | Economy Slate
| style="text-align:right;" |1,829
| style="text-align:right;" |n/a
| style="text-align:right;" |n/a
|-
| style="background-color:#B0E0E6;" |
| style="text-align:left;" | Arthur Davidson (incumbent)
| style="text-align:left;" | Economy Slate
| style="text-align:right;" |1,707
| style="text-align:right;" |n/a
| style="text-align:right;" |n/a
|-
| style="background-color:#FADA5E;" |
| style="text-align:left;" | Charles Pollicott
| style="text-align:left;" | CCF
| style="text-align:right;" |1,388
| style="text-align:right;" |n/a
| style="text-align:right;" |n/a
|-
| style="background-color:#BFC1C2;" |
| style="text-align:left;" | William Brown
| style="text-align:left;" | Independent
| style="text-align:right;" |1,252
| style="text-align:right;" |n/a
| style="text-align:right;" |n/a
|-
| style="text-align:right;background-color:#FFFFFF;" colspan="3" |Total votes
| style="text-align:right;background-color:#FFFFFF;" |n/a
| style="text-align:right;background-color:#FFFFFF;" |n/a
| style="text-align:right;background-color:#FFFFFF;" |
|-
| style="text-align:right;background-color:#FFFFFF;" colspan="3" |Registered voters
| style="text-align:right;background-color:#FFFFFF;" |n/a
| style="text-align:right;background-color:#FFFFFF;" |n/a
| style="text-align:right;background-color:#FFFFFF;" |n/a
|-
| style="text-align:left;" colspan="6" |Note: Candidate campaign colours are used as a visual differentiation between candidates and to indicate affiliation.
|-
| style="text-align:left;" colspan="13" |Sources: "How Aldermanic Candidates Ran", Hamilton Spectator, Tuesday, December 5, 1933, pp. 16.
|}

Ward Five

|-
!rowspan="2" colspan="2"|Candidate
!rowspan="2" colspan="1"|Affiliation
!colspan="3"|Popular vote
|-
! Votes
! %
! ±%
|-
| style="background-color:#B0E0E6;" |
| style="text-align:left;" | Thomas White (incumbent)
| style="text-align:left;" | Economy Slate
| style="text-align:right;" |1,755
| style="text-align:right;" |n/a
| style="text-align:right;" |n/a
|-
| style="background-color:#FADA5E;" |
| style="text-align:left;" | Charles Aitchison (incumbent)
| style="text-align:left;" | CCF
| style="text-align:right;" |1,616
| style="text-align:right;" |n/a
| style="text-align:right;" |n/a
|-
| style="background-color:#B0E0E6;" |
| style="text-align:left;" | Alexander Nelligan
| style="text-align:left;" | Economy Slate
| style="text-align:right;" |1,528
| style="text-align:right;" |n/a
| style="text-align:right;" |n/a
|-
| style="background-color:#E6BE8A;" |
| style="text-align:left;" | John Sherring
| style="text-align:left;" | Independent
| style="text-align:right;" |1,106
| style="text-align:right;" |n/a
| style="text-align:right;" |n/a
|-
| style="background-color:#FADA5E;" |
| style="text-align:left;" | William Peters
| style="text-align:left;" | CCF
| style="text-align:right;" |894
| style="text-align:right;" |n/a
| style="text-align:right;" |n/a
|-
| style="background-color:#838996;" |
| style="text-align:left;" | Bruce Smith
| style="text-align:left;" | Independent
| style="text-align:right;" |535
| style="text-align:right;" |n/a
| style="text-align:right;" |n/a
|-
| style="background-color:#915C83;" |
| style="text-align:left;" | David Atkins
| style="text-align:left;" | Independent
| style="text-align:right;" |458
| style="text-align:right;" |n/a
| style="text-align:right;" |n/a
|-
| style="text-align:right;background-color:#FFFFFF;" colspan="3" |Total votes
| style="text-align:right;background-color:#FFFFFF;" |n/a
| style="text-align:right;background-color:#FFFFFF;" |n/a
| style="text-align:right;background-color:#FFFFFF;" |
|-
| style="text-align:right;background-color:#FFFFFF;" colspan="3" |Registered voters
| style="text-align:right;background-color:#FFFFFF;" |n/a
| style="text-align:right;background-color:#FFFFFF;" |n/a
| style="text-align:right;background-color:#FFFFFF;" |n/a
|-
| style="text-align:left;" colspan="6" |Note: Candidate campaign colours are used as a visual differentiation between candidates and to indicate affiliation.
|-
| style="text-align:left;" colspan="13" |Sources: "How Aldermanic Candidates Ran", Hamilton Spectator, Tuesday, December 5, 1933, pp. 16.
|}

Ward Six

|-
!rowspan="2" colspan="2"|Candidate
!rowspan="2" colspan="1"|Affiliation
!colspan="3"|Popular vote
|-
! Votes
! %
! ±%
|-
| style="background-color:#FADA5E;" |
| style="text-align:left;" | Archie Pollock (incumbent)
| style="text-align:left;" | CCF
| style="text-align:right;" |2,815
| style="text-align:right;" |n/a
| style="text-align:right;" |n/a
|-
| style="background-color:#708090;" |
| style="text-align:left;" | Andy Frame (incumbent)
| style="text-align:left;" | Independent
| style="text-align:right;" |2,399
| style="text-align:right;" |n/a
| style="text-align:right;" |n/a
|-
| style="background-color:#FA8072;" |
| style="text-align:left;" | John Hodgson
| style="text-align:left;" | Independent
| style="text-align:right;" |2,144
| style="text-align:right;" |n/a
| style="text-align:right;" |n/a
|-
| style="background-color:#B0E0E6;" |
| style="text-align:left;" | James Morris
| style="text-align:left;" | Economy Slate
| style="text-align:right;" |1,740
| style="text-align:right;" |n/a
| style="text-align:right;" |n/a
|-
| style="background-color:#FADA5E;" |
| style="text-align:left;" | Frank Thompson
| style="text-align:left;" | CCF
| style="text-align:right;" |1,365
| style="text-align:right;" |n/a
| style="text-align:right;" |n/a
|-
| style="background-color:#93C572;" |
| style="text-align:left;" | Edward Fernside
| style="text-align:left;" | Independent
| style="text-align:right;" |338
| style="text-align:right;" |n/a
| style="text-align:right;" |n/a
|-
| style="text-align:right;background-color:#FFFFFF;" colspan="3" |Total votes
| style="text-align:right;background-color:#FFFFFF;" |n/a
| style="text-align:right;background-color:#FFFFFF;" |n/a
| style="text-align:right;background-color:#FFFFFF;" |
|-
| style="text-align:right;background-color:#FFFFFF;" colspan="3" |Registered voters
| style="text-align:right;background-color:#FFFFFF;" |n/a
| style="text-align:right;background-color:#FFFFFF;" |n/a
| style="text-align:right;background-color:#FFFFFF;" |n/a
|-
| style="text-align:left;" colspan="6" |Note: Candidate campaign colours are used as a visual differentiation between candidates and to indicate affiliation.
|-
| style="text-align:left;" colspan="13" |Sources: "How Aldermanic Candidates Ran", Hamilton Spectator, Tuesday, December 5, 1933, pp. 16.
|}

Ward Seven

|-
!rowspan="2" colspan="2"|Candidate
!rowspan="2" colspan="1"|Affiliation
!colspan="3"|Popular vote
|-
! Votes
! %
! ±%
|-
| style="background-color:#FADA5E;" |
| style="text-align:left;" | Samuel Clarke (incumbent)
| style="text-align:left;" | CCF
| style="text-align:right;" |2,302
| style="text-align:right;" |n/a
| style="text-align:right;" |n/a
|-
| style="background-color:#B0E0E6;" |
| style="text-align:left;" | Thomas Lewington (incumbent)
| style="text-align:left;" | Economy Slate
| style="text-align:right;" |2,053
| style="text-align:right;" |n/a
| style="text-align:right;" |n/a
|-
| style="background-color:#6495ED;" |
| style="text-align:left;" | Archie Burton
| style="text-align:left;" | Independent
| style="text-align:right;" |1,639
| style="text-align:right;" |n/a
| style="text-align:right;" |n/a
|-
| style="background-color:#FADA5E;" |
| style="text-align:left;" | Frank Reeves
| style="text-align:left;" | CCF
| style="text-align:right;" |1,357
| style="text-align:right;" |n/a
| style="text-align:right;" |n/a
|-
| style="background-color:#C41E3A;" |
| style="text-align:left;" | Elizabeth Graham
| style="text-align:left;" | Communist Party
| style="text-align:right;" |642
| style="text-align:right;" |n/a
| style="text-align:right;" |n/a
|-
| style="text-align:right;background-color:#FFFFFF;" colspan="3" |Total votes
| style="text-align:right;background-color:#FFFFFF;" |n/a
| style="text-align:right;background-color:#FFFFFF;" |n/a
| style="text-align:right;background-color:#FFFFFF;" |
|-
| style="text-align:right;background-color:#FFFFFF;" colspan="3" |Registered voters
| style="text-align:right;background-color:#FFFFFF;" |n/a
| style="text-align:right;background-color:#FFFFFF;" |n/a
| style="text-align:right;background-color:#FFFFFF;" |n/a
|-
| style="text-align:left;" colspan="6" |Note: Candidate campaign colours are used as a visual differentiation between candidates and to indicate affiliation.
|-
| style="text-align:left;" colspan="13" |Sources: "How Aldermanic Candidates Ran", Hamilton Spectator, Tuesday, December 5, 1933, pp. 16.
|}

Ward Eight

|-
!rowspan="2" colspan="2"|Candidate
!rowspan="2" colspan="1"|Affiliation
!colspan="3"|Popular vote
|-
! Votes
! %
! ±%
|-
| style="background-color:#FADA5E;" |
| style="text-align:left;" | John Mitchell (incumbent)
| style="text-align:left;" | CCF
| style="text-align:right;" |3,751
| style="text-align:right;" |n/a
| style="text-align:right;" |n/a
|-
| style="background-color:#FADA5E;" |
| style="text-align:left;" | James Reed (incumbent)
| style="text-align:left;" | CCF
| style="text-align:right;" |3,399
| style="text-align:right;" |n/a
| style="text-align:right;" |n/a
|-
| style="background-color:#B0E0E6;" |
| style="text-align:left;" | David Richardson
| style="text-align:left;" | Economy Slate
| style="text-align:right;" |2,249
| style="text-align:right;" |n/a
| style="text-align:right;" |n/a
|-
| style="background-color:#C41E3A;" |
| style="text-align:left;" | James Walker
| style="text-align:left;" | Communist Party
| style="text-align:right;" |975
| style="text-align:right;" |n/a
| style="text-align:right;" |n/a
|-
| style="text-align:right;background-color:#FFFFFF;" colspan="3" |Total votes
| style="text-align:right;background-color:#FFFFFF;" |n/a
| style="text-align:right;background-color:#FFFFFF;" |n/a
| style="text-align:right;background-color:#FFFFFF;" |
|-
| style="text-align:right;background-color:#FFFFFF;" colspan="3" |Registered voters
| style="text-align:right;background-color:#FFFFFF;" |n/a
| style="text-align:right;background-color:#FFFFFF;" |n/a
| style="text-align:right;background-color:#FFFFFF;" |n/a
|-
| style="text-align:left;" colspan="6" |Note: Candidate campaign colours are used as a visual differentiation between candidates and to indicate affiliation.
|-
| style="text-align:left;" colspan="13" |Sources: "How Aldermanic Candidates Ran", Hamilton Spectator, Tuesday, December 5, 1933, pp. 16.
|}

References

1933 Ontario municipal elections
1933